Khuman Salai (literally, "Khuman dynasty") is a clan, which probably ruled parts of Kangleipak (present day Manipur) prior to subjugation by the Ningthouja dynasty (Mangang) c. 13th Century. The Khuman-Lon Puya records information about their rule.

Mythology

Khuman was the son of Iputhou Pakhangba and Loikhumpi Mawai Thoungailenpi. He was born inside Kangla Palace, Imphal at evening when sunset sky is somewhat dark in colour. He ruled the Mayang Imphal province of Kangleipak kingdom as the Khuman province for several years. Khuman Khamba, one of legendary powerful hero from Moirang was amongst Khuman Salai(clan).

See also
Mangang
Luwang
Angom
Moilang
Kha Nganpa
Salai Leishangthem

References

Clans of Meitei